Launch lugs are small cylinders attached to the sides of most model rockets, into which the launch rod is placed prior to a launch.  They are generally made of either plastic or thin cardboard to minimize additional mass.

Use
The sole purpose of launch lug is to provide stability for a model rocket prior to and during liftoff by forcing the rocket to remain parallel to the launch rod during the first seconds of flight, before significant velocities are reached and enough momentum is built up to maintain stability.  At higher velocities, the fins act as the rocket's primary stabilizing devices.

Launch lugs remain attached to rockets throughout flight, and the aerodynamic drag can lead to lower flight altitudes. An alternate way to stabilize a model rocket, and eliminate a launch lug, is to use a tower launcher. The tower launcher has rails which guide the rocket like a launch rod would, until the rocket reaches a velocity where its fins stabilize it for flight.

Position
In smaller rockets, one launch lug is generally considered enough, and is attached at the joint between one of the rocket's fins and the main rocket body.  In larger, heavier model rockets, a second launch lug is generally added closer to the nose cone and lined up with the first, to provide additional support.  The diameter of a launch lug generally closely matches that of the launch rod, although it is very slightly larger to minimize friction during the precarious first moments of flight.  Length varies, ranging from less than a half-inch in smaller rockets to a few inches or longer in larger ones.

References

Model rocketry